Union Maids is a 1976 American documentary film directed by Jim Klein, Julia Reichert and Miles Mogulescu. It was nominated for an Academy Award for Best Documentary Feature. The film was based on the three women from Chicago in the labor history book Rank and File by Staughton Lynd and Alice Lynd.

In 2022, the film was selected for preservation in the United States National Film Registry by the Library of Congress as being "culturally, historically, or aesthetically significant".

Cast
 Kate Hyndman
 Stella Nowicki
 Sylvia Woods

Production
Like many of her other films, Julia Reichert used a collaborative, nonhierarchical model of filmmaking during the production of Union Maids. She and James Klein shot the documentary on video rather than film. This allowed them longer interviews with their subjects, which, also, allowed the three women to better shape their interviews, and thus their contributions to and representation in the film. Also, shooting on video allowed Reichert and Klein to use student cinematographers, as they could watch the video live and give real-time direction without wasting expensive film stock.

References

External links

Union Maids at New Day Films

1976 films
1976 documentary films
1976 independent films
American documentary films
American black-and-white films
American independent films
Documentary films about labor relations in the United States
History of women in Illinois
Films shot in Chicago
1970s English-language films
United States National Film Registry films
1970s American films